Shane Pittman, better known by his stage name Shane Stevens, is an American singer-songwriter born in Myrtle Beach, South Carolina.

Stevens has written for a variety of country and pop acts, including Sara Evans, Carrie Underwood, Lady Antebellum, Kellie Pickler, Jordin Sparks, Ronnie Milsap, Jo Dee Messina, and Hayden Panettiere. Stevens has had multiple singles released to country radio and scored his first Billboard number 1 country hit, "American Honey," with Lady Antebellum in 2010. The song was co-written with Hillary Lindsey and Cary Barlowe.

Stevens contributed the song "Nobody" to Selena Gomez's 2015 album Revival.

Biography 

Stevens signed his first publishing deal with Famous Music in 2001 before signing with Major Bob Music five years later.

Stevens co-wrote 2 songs with Rochelle and country music star Sara Evans for Evans' 2014 album Slow Me Down. He also co-wrote the only original song and title track on Evans' Christmas album, At Christmas, with Toby Lightman. He then contributed 4 songs to the 2014 Jesse McCartney album In Technicolor, including the second single, "Superbad."

He moved to Los Angeles in 2014 to pursue a new direction as a writer, vocal producer, and artist developer in the pop and R&B world. That same year, Stevens founded his own publishing and artist development company, Holy Graffiti LLC, administered by Kobalt Music Group. The first act under his development, The Heirs, has been signed to Capitol Records and they released their debut EP, "Ecliptic," on August 28.

For 2015, Stevens has contributed songs to several pop artists, such as "Everlasting Love," co-written with Victoria Monet and Tommy Brown, on Fifth Harmony's debut album Reflection; "Paper Doll" for Bea Miller's album Not An Apology; "Paradise" for Little Boots' album Working Girl; and At Sunset's single "Every Little Thing."

2016 is already shaping up to be a successful year for Shane, working on songs for many popular artists, such as the track "Step On Up" from Ariana Grande's album Dangerous Woman. He also worked with Meghan Trainor on the song "Woman Up" from her second album Thank You and Toby Randall's song "Misfits." Two songs off of Martina Stoessel & Jorge Blanco's album Tini, "I Want You" and "Yo Te Amo a Ti," were written by Shane as well. Most recently, Shane worked on what Pop Crush has dubbed the song of the summer "What You Want" by The Heirs. He also co-wrote "Infinite Love" by country star Sara Evans & Chrisley Know's Best star Todd Chrisley, which was featured on the season 4 finale.

In 2019, Stevens sold a country music musical to Paramount Pictures, where he co wrote the music with his childhood friend Karyn Rochelle.

Stevens signed a worldwide co-publishing deal with Bob Doyle's publishing company Purplebeat in 2021 where Stevens received his first Grammy nomination for the song "Fancy Like" by Walker Hayes.

Television 

Stevens starred alongside Sherrié Austin and an ensemble cast in the second season of the SundanceTV docuseries Girls Who Like Boys Who Like Boys.

Awards 

In 2011, Stevens' co-write for Lady Antebellum's "American Honey" won the Nashville Songwriters Association International award for one of the "Songs I Wish I'd Written," as well as the Millionaire and Most-Performed Country Songs of the Year awards from BMI for this song.

Discography

References 

People from Myrtle Beach, South Carolina
Living people
Songwriters from South Carolina
Year of birth missing (living people)